Hilgardia was a peer-reviewed academic journal published by the California Agricultural Experiment Station, which was founded by the Agricultural Experiment Stations Act of 1887. The title honors Eugene W. Hilgard, who was from 1875 to 1904 Professor of Agricultural Chemistry at UC Berkeley and was also the California Agricultural Experiment Station's first Director. The journal, which was published from 1925 (volume 1) to 1995 (volume 62), published a total of 972 articles.

The Hilgardia Project, launched in April 2011, has now made freely available all of the Hilgardia articles in online pdf format. Many of the articles, 71 of which deal with viticulture, are still of scientific and commercial interest. According to Janet White:

Selected publications with high citation numbers
 (over 2000 citations)

 (over 1300 citations)
 (over 1600 citations)

References

External links

Irregular journals
English-language journals
Biology journals
Agricultural journals
Publications established in 1925
Publications disestablished in 1995
Defunct journals of the United States